Piola is a genus of longhorn beetles of the subfamily Lamiinae, containing the following species:

 Piola colombica Martins & Galileo, 1999
 Piola quiabentiae Marinoni, 1974
 Piola rubra Martins & Galileo, 1999
 Piola unicolor Martins & Galileo, 1999

References

Phacellini